Cameroon English is an English dialect spoken predominantly in Cameroon, mostly learned as a second language. It shares some similarities with English varieties in neighbouring West Africa, as Cameroon lies at the west of Central Africa. It is primarily spoken in the Northwest and Southwest regions of Cameroon.

It is a postcolonial variety of English, long in use in the territory (Southern Cameroons, now split into Northwest and Southwest). Over the years, it has developed characteristic features, particularly in lexis but also in phonology and grammar. Those characteristics were once regarded as errors but are now increasingly accepted as distinctive Cameroonian contributions to the English language.

Phonological features
Similarly, "lock" and "luck" are pronounced alike. And "white-collar worker" sometimes becomes "white-colour worker" in Cameroon.

Expressions
Characteristic turns of phrase in the country or local coinages:
"detailly" = in detail
"to see with me" = to agree with me; to see my point of view
"installmentally" = by installments
"of recent" = recently; lately

See also
Languages of Cameroon
Cameroonian Pidgin English
Camfranglais (when mixed with French)
Anglophone Cameroonian
Anglophone problem (Cameroon)

References

https://web.archive.org/web/20060917043540/http://www2.univ-reunion.fr/~ageof/text/74c21e88-656.html

Further reading

Kouega, Jean-Paul (1999). Some Major Speech Traits of Cameroon Media News in English. English Studies 80(6), 540-555
Kouega, Jean-Paul (2000). Some Aspects of Cameroon English Prosody. Alizes, 19, 137-153
Kouega, Jean-Paul (2003). Influence of Contacts between Western and African Cultures on English in Cameroon. Proceedings of the Unifying Aspects of Cultures conference at Vienna, Austria, November 7–9.
In: TRANS. Internet-Zeitschrift für Kulturwissenschaften. No. 15/2003, (2003). WWW: http://www.inst.at/trans/15Nr/07_2/kouega15.htm.
Kouega, Jean-Paul (2005). The Effects of French on English L2 in Cameroon. In J. Cohen, K. T. McAlister, K. Rolstad, and J. MacSwan (Eds.) ISB4: Proceedings of the 4th International Symposium on Bilingualism (pp. 1201–1210). Somerville, MA, USA: Cascadilla Press.
Kouega, Jean-Paul, (2006). Aspects of Cameroon English Usage: A Lexical Appraisal. Muenchen, Germany: Lincom Europa. 
Kouega, Jean-Paul (2006c). Interplay of Accent and Orthography in L2 English in Cameroon. Annals of the Faculty of Arts, Letters and Social Sciences, University of Yaounde 1(5), 183-197
Kouega, Jean-Paul (2007). Forenames in Cameroon English speech. The International Journal of Language, Society and Culture, 23, 32–46.
Talla Sando Ouafeu Yves (2006). Intonational meaning in Cameroon English discourse: a sociolinguistic perspective. Goettingen: Cuvillier Verlag

Dialects of English
Languages of Cameroon